João Nunes may refer to:

Nunes (footballer, born 1954), born João Batista Nunes de Oliveira, Brazilian football striker
João Nunes (footballer, born 1995), Portuguese football centre-back